Rey Rivera (born 14 December 1965) is a Puerto Rican boxer. He competed in the men's light middleweight event at the 1988 Summer Olympics.

References

1965 births
Living people
Puerto Rican male boxers
Olympic boxers of Puerto Rico
Boxers at the 1988 Summer Olympics
Place of birth missing (living people)
Pan American Games medalists in boxing
Pan American Games bronze medalists for Puerto Rico
Boxers at the 1987 Pan American Games
Light-middleweight boxers
Medalists at the 1987 Pan American Games